The Macau Security Force is Macau's public security body under the Secretariat for Security, responsible for handling government activities ranging from law enforcement to public safety.

History
In 1975, the MSF was created to take the place of the Macau Independent Territorial Command, which was in charge of Portuguese military forces in charge of the colony's military security. Portuguese military involvement were removed in 1995 and were replaced by Macanese officers recruited to the MSF.

On December 20, 1999, the various police force branches of Macau (Security Forces of Macau and Judiciary Police), under the jurisdiction of Security and Justice departments (except the customs police, who were reassigned to the Financial Service Department) were assigned to the MSF, under the supervision of the secretary of security (security department). At the time of the handover of Macau to the People's Republic of China, plans were in place to modernize the police force with the goal of better positioning the force to combat organized crime and to stop illegal immigration.

On October 15, 2019, the MSF's Discipline Supervision Committee was given the power to investigate complaints made towards anyone working under the MSF.

Structure

The MSF has the following organizations under its command:

 Public Security Forces Affairs Bureau (DSFSM)
 Unitary Police Service (SPU)
 Public Security Police Force of Macau (PSP)
 Judiciary Police (PJ)
 Correctional Services Bureau (DSC)
 Fire Services Bureau (CB)
 Macau Customs Service
 Academy of Public Security Forces

Academy of Public Security Forces

MSF Joint Center of Instruction was created in 1976 to attract membership from the public. The current training school was created in 1988 to provide higher level of training.

Lai Minhua, studied at the academy before progressing to the role of Director General of Macao Customs Service. She died in 2015, and doubt has been raised over the verdict of death by suicide.

See also 

 People's Liberation Army Macau Garrison

References

External links 
 FSM Website 

Government departments and agencies of Macau